The Mayon Planetarium and Science Park also known as the  Virtual Mayon Simulation and Observatory Facility is a planetarium and geology museum in the city of Tabaco in Albay, Philippines.

The planetarium was built under the initiative of former House of Representatives member, Edcel Lagman Sr. Its construction was funded by the Priority Development Assistance Fund allocated to Lagman. The facility is operated by the city government of Tabaco.

The planetarium grounds covers a  area. The planetarium also host observation facilities which offers panoramic view of nearby towns and geographical features including the Mayon Volcano itself.

The building has a single storey and hosts four rooms which houses a library, the virtual room, a mini-museum and an audiovisual hall. The dome measures .

References

Planetaria in the Philippines
Geology museums
Buildings and structures in Albay
Buildings and structures completed in 2006
Tourist attractions in Albay
2006 establishments in the Philippines
21st-century architecture in the Philippines